is one of the seven mat holds, Osaekomi-waza, of Kodokan Judo. In grappling terms, it is categorized as a mounted position.

Technique description 
Graphic from http://judoinfo.com/techdrw.htm

Exemplar Videos:

Demonstrated from http://www.judoinfo.com/video6.htm

Known as the full mount in Brazilian Jiu Jitsu and other grappling arts. You sit astride your opponent knees up high under armpits to avoid being bucked or alternatively lying on top of your opponent grapevining their legs with your own whilst your arms act as stabilisers and your chest smothering their airways. When the opponent weakens from exhaustion/asphyxiation one should then consider the following options.
 
The high armpit position allows transition to armbars the other to various choke holds.

Technique history

Included systems 
Systems:
Kodokan Judo, Judo Lists
Lists:
The Canon of Judo
Judo technique
Brazilian Jiu-Jitsu, Theory and Technique

Escapes

Upa 
Upa is described as a technique onto itself in the book Brazilian Jiu-Jitsu, Theory and Technique, and demonstrated in the video Gracie_Jiu-Jitsu_Basics_Vol.1.
It is also part of the movement described as the cross lock (juji-jime) defense method in the book The Canon of Judo.

Elbow escape 
"The elbow escape from the mounted position" is described in the book Brazilian Jiu-Jitsu, Theory and Technique,
and demonstrated in the video Gracie_Jiu-Jitsu_Basics_Vol.1.

Others 
Arm Pull and Roll Over Tate Shiho Gatame Escape

Submissions

Similar techniques, variants, and aliases

Kuzure-Tate-Shiho-Gatame 
The Canon of Judo lists a variation as a separate technique, where tori secures one of uke's arms instead of uke's neck, as demonstrated in the above animation, while holding onto the belt.

Others 
English aliases:
Horizontal four quarter hold
Variants:
Double Arm Tate-Shiho-Gatame
Head Lock Tate-Shiho-Gatame
Reverse Head Lock Tate-Shiho-Gatame
Arm Hold Tate-Shiho-Gatame
Thigh on Shoulder/Arm Hold Tate-Shiho-Gatame

Judo technique